is a Kumano shrine in Shinjuku, Tokyo, Japan.

External links
 

Buildings and structures in Shinjuku
Kumano shrines